This is a list of mass shootings in the United States from 2000–2009.

Mass shootings are incidents involving several victims of firearm-related violence. The precise inclusion criteria are disputed, and there is no broadly accepted definition.

The Gun Violence Archive, a nonprofit research group that tracks shootings and their characteristics in the United States, defines a mass shooting as an incident in which four or more people, excluding the perpetrator(s), are shot in one location at roughly the same time. The Congressional Research Service narrows that definition further, only considering what it defines as "public mass shootings", and only considering victims as those who are killed, excluding any victims who survive. The Washington Post and Mother Jones use similar definitions, with the latter acknowledging that their definition "is a conservative measure of the problem", as many rampages with fewer fatalities occur. The crowdsourced Mass Shooting Tracker project uses a definition even looser than the Gun Violence Archive's definition: four people shot in one incident regardless of the circumstances.

Larger documentation of mass shootings in the United States has occurred through independent and scholarly studies such as the Stanford University Mass Shootings in America Data Project.

Definitions 
There are varying definitions of a mass shooting. Listed roughly from most broad to most restrictive:

 Stanford MSA Data Project: 3+ shot in one incident, at one location, at roughly the same time, excluding organized crime, as well as gang-related and drug-related shootings.
 Mass Shooting Tracker: 4+ shot in one incident, at one location, at roughly the same time.
 Gun Violence Archive/Vox: 4+ shot in one incident, excluding the perpetrator(s), at one location, at roughly the same time.
 Mother Jones: 3+ shot and killed in one incident, excluding the perpetrator(s), at a public place, excluding gang-related killings.
 The Washington Post: 4+ shot and killed in one incident, excluding the perpetrator(s), at a public place, excluding gang-related killings.
 Congressional Research Service: 4+ shot and killed in one incident, excluding the perpetrator(s), at a public place, excluding gang-related killings, acts carried out that were inspired by criminal profit, and terrorism.

Only shootings that have Wikipedia articles of their own are included in this list. Detailed lists of mass shootings can be found per-year at their respective pages.

List of mass shootings (2000–2009)

2009

2008

2007

2006

2005

2004

2003

2002

2001

2000

Notes

References 

2000s mass shootings in the United States
United States crime-related lists
2000
2000